WSWN (900 AM) is a radio station formerly broadcasting a talk format branded as "Talk of the Palm Beaches." It was better known in the South Florida and Treasure Coast areas as "Sugar 900," named after the surrounding sugar cane industry in the Belle Glade and Pahokee area. The station is licensed to serve 18 counties across South Florida in the United States, and the Caribbean.

The station is currently owned by Sylna Leger-Brazile, through licensee Sugar Broadcasting, Inc.

History
WSWN signed on as a daytime-only station October 5, 1947, broadcasting on 900 kHz with 1 kW power. Owned by Seminole Broadcasting Company and licensed to Belle Glade, it was initially known as "The Mighty Ninety" (the same as Seminole's WEAS in Savannah, Georgia). This was because most radios of the time did not include the last zero of the frequency on their dial displays. Thanks to the stations' overlapping signals Dee Rivers (owner and operator of Seminole) branded both with the same positioning and ID's, which effectively provided car based listeners with a continuous experience from Central Florida to Southern Georgia.

After winning FCC approval to go to a 24-hour broadcast schedule, WSWN became known as the "Little Station with the Long Reach" for its ability to be heard as far away as Charleston and Mobile from dusk till dawn. This, despite the fact that its paltry 1,000 watts could scarcely be heard in West Palm Beach during the day. Over the years attempts at raising power were blocked due to signal overlap issues with WMOP 900 AM in the Gainesville-Ocala, Florida area. With its fate virtually sealed as a local-only station during the day, the 1970s saw even its nighttime listenership erode with the emergence of country music powerhouses like WQAM in Miami and WIRK in West Palm Beach. However with a devout local following and a niche Southern Gospel morning show, management/ownership doggedly clung to the country format even though the demographic was at least sixty-five percent black.

Finally, in the 1980s newly rebranded Rivers Broadcasting relented and an experienced black PD named Joe Fisher was permitted to change the format to what was then referred to as R&B, with a strong emphasis on Black Gospel. But for only 18 hours a day. The station would retain its Southern Gospel morning show. Rivers declining Savannah, Georgia station had previously carried an exclusively R&B format from the late 1940s until 1960, when it switched to a country music format. However due to popular demand R&B was eventually reintroduced in the late night hours, as hosted by "Nat The Cat," who played a variety of R&B music until the early 80s. His segment and time slot became affectionately referred to as Nat the Cat with Hot Butter Soul. Which also ran for a time at WSWN in Belle Glade, prompting some to regard Nat as the "First Black DJ of the Glades." 

Since the early 1960s the beloved host of WSWN's Southern Gospel morning show was Jimmy Sims a homespun, American Gothic-type character from Alabama who had previously enjoyed success at a station in Defuniak Springs. By the 1980s he'd become known to many as "Reverend Sims," though he was never formally ordained. Sims actually had a significant following among blacks, but there were those who resented the half-hearted attempt by ownership at addressing their community. It didn't help that management always seemed unsympathetic. Even discriminatory. Indeed VP/GM Phil Haire was often characterized as 'racist' on the street and did little to discourage it.

In this difficult environment new PD, Joe Fisher positioned WSWN with the moniker: 'Sugar 900' (pronounced Suga900), a reference to the number one industry in the Glades—sugarcane farming and processing. He managed to craft a slick package including professional imaging and good talent which at times sounded world-class. Additionally the all-important weekend,  and especially Sunday Morning programming had been left open for Black Gospel. This was something of a "cash cow" thanks to ministries both near and far anxious to purchase air-time. 

Meanwhile Belle Glade's lone FM frequency (93.5), purchased by Rivers in 1965 and left dark for over a decade was being prepared to assume the Country format. Power was 10,000 watts broadcast from a 420ft. tower, the maximum permitted due to its close proximity to an airport and overlap issues with similar frequencies in Vero Beach and Key Largo. Once again, a Belle Glade station was relegated to "local-only" status. It finally went on the air as WSWN-FM on October 10, 1978. Rivers' plans to boost the signal of WSWN-FM to appeal to Hispanic audiences in Cuba were stymied due to the station's ineffective radiation pattern. Forced to continue broadcasting or lose the frequency, Rivers introduced a 24-hour Country format on 93.5 FM.

The 80s
It was clear that WSWN-FM would struggle to find it's place. On the other hand, 'Sugar 900' (WSWN-AM) reached new heights. However, within a few years Fisher was allegedly struck down by the crack-cocaine epidemic and the station foundered under his less than attentive direction. A succession of replacements including self-styled program consultants, fresh faced Connecticut School of Broadcasting graduates and Phil Haire's own daughter tried their hand in the late 80s and early 90s. All sunk to new lows in programming. In fact, Tammy Haire may have pulled one of the all time blunders in the West Palm Beach market when, as acting GM in her father's absence she switched the FM's format to Soft Hits. This virtually dropped the Country format into the lap of competing station WAFC in Clewiston. As white listeners in the south Lake Okeechobee area listen almost exclusively to country music, one is left to wonder what she had in mind. Ms. Haire also incurred the wrath of ownership when she made nearly $35,000.00 in improvements to the WSWN-FM studios. On June 19, 1989, the station changed its call sign to the current WBGF.  

In spite of his daughter's actions and with his cancer battle over Phil Haire was welcomed back by his old friend Marie, the widowed owner of Rivers (now once again Seminole Broadcasting). He quickly validated her faith by automating WBGF. Arrangements were made to carry programming via satellite from Jones Radio Networks for a very reasonable $250.00 per station, per month. Of course an up-front investment of around $10,000 in computer automation equipment was needed, but payroll would be immediately reduced by at least fifty percent. Then, ignoring traditional format constraints Haire began selling blocks of airtime to any and all comers. Suddenly, the listed formats (Gospel, Country, R&B, etc.) became nothing more than filler for blocks that remained unsold. While such a move repulses programming purists, it was actually quite savvy. With the only considerations now involving decency, things like unfortunate format changes and declining sound quality seemed irrelevant. Infomercials, broadcast ministries, political messages, agency media, sponsored events—these weren't new to radio, but their wholesale inclusion was. Brilliant in the minds of ownership. Infuriating to the mainstream listener.

In one swoop Haire had slashed payroll (with the promise of more to come), completely eliminated programming positions, and helped pioneer a new business model for small struggling station owners. Indeed, even larger stations in metropolitan areas have since employed similar programming with ever-evolving digital technologies like the internet, iPod and satellite radio taking ever larger portions of the pie.

The 90s
By 1996 both stations had been on the block for several years. Anxious to retire, Marie Rivers accepted an offer made by 2 partners from New York calling themselves Atlas News & Information Service, Inc. David Lampel was the hands-on "radio man" who had worked his way to PD and later GM at WLIB in New York City then to Senior Vice President of the station's parent, Inner City Broadcasting Corporation. Michael Wach was a sales and administration specialist with Wall Street and Madison Avenue connections, who had served as vice president and general manager of WLNY-TV on Long Island and held executive positions with WPIX-TV in New York and Boston's WHDH-TV. Together, Lampel and Wach had already purchased a television station and several radio stations in the Virgin Islands and Puerto Rico. Now WBGF/WSWN would be united with a 100,000 watt FM in Isla Morada under the name BGI Broadcasting.

BGI’s first move was to flip WBGF-FM to the Hot New Country format offered by Jones Radio, brand it "Big Dawg Country" and launch a live/local morning show hosted by Dave Hazzard a.k.a. "Cousin Dave." The WSWN-AM format remained largely untouched, but the axe finally fell on the air staff. Henceforth, 6P-6A would be satellite automated featuring the Urban Gold format from ABC Networks. Saturday was live Gospel from 6-10 a.m., then automated until Sunday when live Gospel aired from 6 a.m. to at least 6 p.m. And sometimes later, depending on how much airtime had been sold. The patented Phil Haire method was embraced, and was in fact given new life with the prospect of offering customers more coverage via simulcast to other properties. Although hobbled, with failing health in his late seventies Haire was a formidable sales tool with connections that reached to Tallahassee, and beyond. Additionally he was something of a local icon with a colorful past, referred to by many as the 'Glades Radio Boss'. 

In 1998 Michael Wach sold his interest in Atlas News & Information Service to become vice president and general manager at WNYW/FOX 5-TV in New York, the Fox Network's flagship station. This left Lampel as majority shareholder, if not outright owner. As he had directed operations thus far anyway, there were no new changes—just forward progress. More employees were dismissed until, by 1999 the entire staff of both stations combined (sales, administration and "on air") consisted of only 7 or 8 individuals. And there was about to be one less.

The 2000s
By 2000 the decision was made to swap studios. The more successful WSWN-AM would be moved from its cramped hovel with archaic equipment to the much larger state-of-the-art WBGF-FM studio which had been improved years before. The perennially strapped FM would now rightfully occupy the less prominent quarters in the back of the same building. 

While one might assume WSWN personnel to be jubilant over this new development, it actually became a source of contention between management and one of South Florida's longest-running on-air personalities, Jimmy Sims. For years Sims had battled a variety of ailments including severe arthritis which left him with knarled digits and painful joints. He was physically unable to stand for long periods at the much higher console in the former FM studio. When the counter-height chairs provided by management still complicated his condition, ownership was unmoved and offered no further compromise. Sims faded from the airwaves. The inevitable onslaught of complaints from loyal listeners and the threat of a lawsuit under the Americans With Disabilities Act changed nothing. His long 38-year association with broadcasting in the Glades came to an unceremonious end.

The stations continued under the ownership of Atlas News & Information, Inc./BGI Broadcasting—which soon relocated from New York to Las Vegas. WSWN remained a Gospel station, but WBGF eventually ditched Jones and ABC Networks' in favor of a Mexican Regional format produced in-house. Intended to service the ethnic sharecroppers of the Belle Glade area, where the demographic had long since shifted from primarily African American/Caribbean-based to Latin/Mexican-based, 93.5 WBGF became known as "Radio Lobo." 

Phil Haire passed away in April 2006. By all accounts he remained GM and checked in daily right up to the last week of his life. Mike D'Augustine was appointed to succeed Haire.

(History based on information provided by Dave Hazzard of West Palm Beach, Florida. Official dates and technical info, along with supplemental history on "Nat the Cat" and “Radio Lobo” programming provided by Mark Tillery of Ocala, Florida)

2014 to 2017
Then, on September 29, 2014, WSWN "Sugar 900" was no more, as the station was purchased by JVC Broadcasting of New York—along with WSWN's FM sister station, WBGF 93.5. Retaining its call letters, WSWN flipped to brokered and satellite talk as "The Talk of the Palm Beaches," and carried a live and local morning news and talk program hosted by local radio mainstays Gerard Campell (formerly of WFTL 850 AM "News Talk") and Lindy Rome (of Sunny 104.3 FM). WBGF 93.5 dumped the regional Mexican programming and became "93.5 The Bar" with an Alternative Active Rock format and carried the controversial and syndicated "Bubba the Love Sponge" radio program.

By May 19, 2017, ANCO Media Group purchased WBGF 93.5 and rebranded it as a dance rock format, "Revolution 93.5" creating a mini-South Florida radio network—mirroring a station the Keys, and two FM translators, one in Dade and one in Broward County.

By November 2017, JVC Media co-founder Vic Canales, in a pair of deals worth a combined $751,111, sold his ownership position in the company. Canales—better known by his on-air name "Vic Latino"—stuck a deal to swap his stake in the nine-year-old company for a trio of signals. Canales exchanged his shares worth a combined $450,000 for oldies WSVU (960) and two translators: the North Palm Beach, FL-licensed translator W240CI at 95.5 FM and the Jupiter, FL-licensed translator W295BJ at 106.9 FM. Together the three signals were/are branded as "True Oldies Channel 95.9-106.9." Once the deal closed, JVC Media continued to own and operate WSWN 900 AM.

By December 1, 2017, WSWN 900 dumped its network satellite, time brokered catch-all of health, legal, financial, and entertainment infomercial programming as "The Talk of the Palm Beaches" and returned to 24-hour brokered black gospel programming as the "New Sugar 900." Now, during its unsold airtime, it runs black gospel music as its filler programming. The station brought back Sugar 900's most recent and extremely popular morning show host, "Church Boy," with his 6 to 10 am weekday morning show and Gospel radio veteran Dawn Brady who first made her voice heard to Sugar 900 listeners in 2008. The broadcast industry publications Radio and Television Business Report, All Access, Radio Insight confirmed the sale of WSWN 900 AM to James Leger's Sugar Broadcasting.

Meanwhile 93.5 WBGF is currently in the midst of a deal that will result in the station to become one of the United States' first foreign owned broadcast facilities—by Marco Mazzoli an extremely popular Italian/Milan-based radio personality.

Effective August 10, 2018, JVC Media sold WSWN to Sugar Broadcasting, Inc. for $125,000.

(Updated biography as of December 7/8, 2017, based on information provided by Mark Tillery of Ocala, Florida)

The influence of Harvey J. Poole Sr. on WSWN and WBGF
No commentary on the history of radio in the Glades, and specifically WSWN/WBGF, would be complete without mention of Harvey J. Poole Sr. Born in Georgia, he came to Belle Glade in the 1930s. Following several menial jobs Poole landed at WSWN in 1947. Over the next five decades he served loyally in various roles, most notably air personality and account executive. All the while suffering racial indignities from an alleged lynching attempt by area teenagers to extreme prejudice by landlords and employers. He quietly built a large stable of clients and became known to listeners as the "Ebony Voice" for his deep-throated tones, which could be equally thunderous or velvety soft. Somewhere in there he managed to buy a home, ran several of his own businesses, became a pillar of church & community, and raised 4 children with his wife of over 60 years. Close associates knew him as Brother Poole, or just Mr. Poole and greatly respected his age and gentle wisdom. He died 04/23/08 at the age of 94. Son, Harvey Jr. (known professionally as Harvey J) was appointed WSWN Program Director, and remained so during much of the elder Poole's final years.

(by Dave Hazzard)

References
History Information by Dave Hazzard, West Palm Beach, Florida, with official dates and technical info, along with supplemental history on "Nat the Cat" programming as well as updated history (2014-2017) provided by Mark Tillery, Ocala, Florida

External links

SWN
1947 establishments in Florida
Radio stations established in 1947